Jessica Mannetti is an American basketball coach and current head coach for the Sacred Heart Pioneers women's basketball team.

Coaching career
Mannetti was head coach at Greens Farms Academy in Westport, Connecticut, from 2003 to 2009. During her time at Green Farms she developed the program from junior varsity status to leading the Dragons to the playoffs in her final season.

Hofstra
As an assistant coach at Hofstra, she helped guide the Pride to two WNIT appearances, while also bringing in the sixth best mid-major recruiting class in 2011.

Sacred Heart
Mannetti returned to Connecticut to become head coach at Sacred Heart in 2013, after Ed Swanson left after twenty three years to become the head coach at William & Mary.

Head coaching record

References

External links
 Official Biography, Sacred Heart Pioneers

Living people
People from New Canaan, Connecticut
American women's basketball coaches
Basketball coaches from Connecticut
Concordia College (New York) alumni
Sacred Heart Pioneers women's basketball coaches
Hofstra Pride women's basketball coaches
Sportspeople from Fairfield County, Connecticut
Year of birth missing (living people)